New Bethel Baptist Church may refer to:

 New Bethel Baptist Church (Detroit, Michigan)
 New Bethel Baptist Church (Oak Ridge, Tennessee)

See also
 Bethel Baptist Church (disambiguation)